The Colonel A. M. Shook House (also known as Boyd House) is a historic residence in Tracy City, Tennessee, United States. It was listed on the National Register of Historic Places on April 1, 1987.

History
The house, located at the junction of Railroad Avenue and Montgomery Streets, was built in 1890 for Colonel Alfred Montgomery Shook, prominent in the coal industry in Grundy County. The -story frame house was designed in the Second Empire architectural style.

See also

 National Register of Historic Places listings in Grundy County, Tennessee

References

External links

Houses on the National Register of Historic Places in Tennessee
Houses in Grundy County, Tennessee
Second Empire architecture in Tennessee
National Register of Historic Places in Grundy County, Tennessee